Mike Brodie (born in 1985), also known as the "Polaroid Kid" or "Polaroid Kidd", is an American photographer. From 2004 to 2008, Brodie freighthopped across the US, photographing people he encountered, largely train-hoppers, vagabonds, squatters, and hobos. He published the photography books A Period of Juvenile Prosperity (2013) and Tones of Dirt and Bone (2015), but hasn't taken pictures since 2008.

Life and work
Michael Christopher Brodie was born on April 5, 1985, in Mesa, Arizona, the son of Frankie and Gary Brodie. His mother worked most of her life as a maid and caregiver, though is currently a cashier at Walgreens, while his father is currently serving his 3rd prison sentence at the Florence State Prison, in Arizona. In 2000, the Brodie family moved to Pensacola, Florida where Brodie met his first girlfriend who introduced him to the punk rock music scene and the lifestyle therein.

In 2003, while washing dishes at his home, Brodie witnessed a young couple huddled close together on a passing railroad freight car, intrigued by this, Brodie (then age 18) left home, eventually freighthopping across the US from 2004 to 2008. He photographed his experiences including the people he encountered, largely train-hoppers, vagabonds, squatters and hobos. Initially he used a Polaroid SX-70 given to him by a friend. When Polaroid discontinued SX-70 film around 2005/2006 he swapped to a Nikon F3 and 35 mm film.

His first cross-country trip brought him to Oakland, CA where he met Paul Schiek, founder of TBW Books. Schiek helped Brodie produce two bodies of work from this (latter) period: Tones of Dirt and Bone and A Period of Juvenile Prosperity, which have been exhibited in galleries and become books. Although A Period of Juvenile Prosperity was published and exhibited first, the images in Tones of Dirt and Bone were produced earlier, when Brodie used Polaroid film, before he switched to the 35 mm format of A Period of Juvenile Prosperity. "The 35mm format let me shoot more candidly and truly capture real moments, not staged portraits."

A Period of Juvenile Prosperity was included in lists of best photobooks of 2013 by critic Sean O'Hagan in The Guardian, Clinton Cargill in The New York Times, Dazed, Mother Jones and American Photo magazine. Kenneth Baker, writing in the San Francisco Chronicle, listed the A Period of Juvenile Prosperity exhibition at Stephen Wirtz Gallery in his top 10 list for 2013. Vince Aletti in Artforum named Brodie's show in New York as the show of the year, and has said of Brodie's work: "Even if you're not intrigued by Brodie's ragtag bohemian cohort—a band of outsiders with an unerring sense of post-punk style—the intimate size and warm, slightly faded color of his prints are seductive. His portraits . . . have a tender incisiveness that is rare at any age." Martin Parr and Gerry Badger call the photographs of  A Period of Juvenile Prosperity "unashamedly romantic and warm toned".

Photographer Alec Soth, writing in The Telegraph, included A Period of Juvenile Prosperity in his top ten photobooks of 2013:

Writing in his own blog, Soth also said "Everything about this book is perfect: the size, printing, sequence, cover image, title and essay." Parr and Badger include the book in the third volume of their photobook history, saying that "what makes this book stand out is the quality of the photographs".

Brodie has also collaborated with Swoon, Chris Stain, and Monica Canilao.

In 2009, Brodie attended and graduated from the Nashville Auto-Diesel College, in Nashville, TN, with goals of attaining a career in that field.

After A Period of Juvenile Prosperity was released in 2013, Brodie said he was giving up photography. In 2015, he confirmed this, in an interview with GUP magazine: "I do not take photographs, I have begun a new adventure. I started building my very own machine shop to accommodate the remanufacturing of diesel engines." As of 2017 Brodie is working as a diesel mechanic for the Union Pacific Railroad, as is his wife, who works as a conductor.

Publications
Tones of Dirt and Bone.
Subscription Series #1. Oakland, CA: TBW, 2006. Edition of 500 copies. Brodie, Paul Schiek, Ari Marcopolous and Jim Goldberg each had one book in a set of four.
Santa Fe, NM: Twin Palms, 2015. . Edition of 3000 copies.
A Period of Juvenile Prosperity. Santa Fe, NM: Twin Palms, 2013. . Available in a first edition, a second edition of 3000 copies, and a third edition.

Exhibitions

Solo exhibitions
2006: Tones of Dirt and Bone, M+B Gallery, Los Angeles, CA
2006: Paris International Photo Fair, Carrousel du Louvre, Paris
2007: Homesteadaz, Get This! Gallery, Atlanta, GA
2007: Ridin' Dirty Face, Needles and Pens, San Francisco, CA
2007: Tones of Dirt and Bone, Bonni Benrubi Gallery, New York, NY
2013: **A Period of Juvenile Prosperity. Yossi Milo Gallery, New York, NY
2013: A Period of Juvenile Prosperity. M+B Gallery, Los Angeles, CA
2013: Stephen Wirtz Gallery, San Francisco, CA
2013: Get This! Gallery, Atlanta, GA
2019: Public Land gallery, Sacramento, CA. New photographs.

Exhibitions with others
2007: Galerie LJ, Paris, with Swoon and Chris Stain
2007: Paper Boat Gallery, Milwaukee. Collaboration with Monica Canilao

Notes

References

External links
 
 Mike Brodie at the Deutsche Börse Photography Foundation

1985 births
American photographers
Living people
Artists from Arizona